Nordin is a community in the Canadian province of New Brunswick. It borders French Fort Cove and is now part of the city of Miramichi.

Notable people

See also
List of neighbourhoods in New Brunswick

References

Neighbourhoods in Miramichi, New Brunswick